Clackriach Castle was a 16th-century tower house, about  north of Ellon, Aberdeenshire, Scotland, and  south-east of Maud, south of the South Ugie Water.

Alternative names are Glackriach Castle and Clachraich Castle.

History
The property belonged to the Keiths.

Structure
In the inside angle are remains of a staircase. The walls are roughly coursed with rubble infilling, lime mortared.

The castle was on a slight eminence.  It was an oblong building with a projecting wing; there was a turreted staircase, and arched doorway and window, evidence of which remained up to the 19th century.

Vicinity
The disused Mill of Clackriach dates to around 1827. As of 1990, its brick kiln was partly fallen in. Nearby Mill House is of similar age.

Windhill Farm, from the 18th century, sits high on the slopes of the Hill of Dens. It is "a crouching farmhouse with coped chimneys and large granite skew putts with a large porch, c. 1800, and pantiled steading".

See also
Castles in Great Britain and Ireland
List of castles in Scotland

References

Bibliography

Castles in Aberdeenshire